Savci is a settlement in the Slovene Hills in the Municipality of Sveti Tomaž in northeastern Slovenia. The area traditionally belonged to the Styria region and is now included in the Drava Statistical Region.

The village chapel with a belfry was built in 1895.

Notable people
Notable people that were born or lived in Savci include:
Stanko Cajnkar  (1900–1977), writer

References

External links

Savci on Geopedia

Populated places in the Municipality of Sveti Tomaž